Wishin' and Hopin is a 2014 American coming of age comedy film starring Wyatt Ralff, Molly Ringwald, Chevy Chase and Annabella Sciorra based on the 2009 novel Wishin' and Hopin': A Christmas Story by Wally Lamb.  Filmed in and around Norwich, Connecticut, and Willimantic, CT. film received a limited theatrical release at the Garde Arts Center on November 23, 2014 and premiered on Lifetime on December 6, 2014. It was the final film appearance of Meat Loaf before his death in January 2022.

Plot summary
Fifth-grader Felix Funicello (Ralff), the cousin of famous Mickey Mouse Club Mousekteer and teen idol/movie actress Annette Funicello, lives in the fictional small town of Three Rivers, Connecticut.  In 1964, he and his classmates at St. Aloyius Gonzaga Parochial School have a momentous fall semester after lay substitute teacher Madame Frechette (Ringwald) and Zhenya (Cohen), a new student from Russia, arrive.  Madame Frechette implements a new concept for the school's Christmas pageant and competition for key roles ensues.  The story is narrated in the present day by Felix as an adult (Chase).

Cast

See also

 List of Christmas films

References

External links
 
 

2014 television films
2014 films
Lifetime (TV network) films
American coming-of-age films
Films set in 1964
Films set in Connecticut
Films shot in Connecticut
American Christmas films
Films based on American novels
Christmas television films
2010s coming-of-age films
2010s English-language films
2010s American films